The Metro Manila Film Festival Award for Best Child Performer is an award presented annually by the Metropolitan Manila Development Authority (MMDA). It was first awarded at the 6th Metro Manila Film Festival ceremony, held in 1980; Julie Vega won the award for her performance in Kape't Gatas and it is given to a child acting in a motion picture. Currently, nominees and winners are determined by Executive Committees, headed by the Metropolitan Manila Development Authority Chairman and key members of the film industry.

Winners and nominees

1980s

1990s

2000s

2010s

2020s

Multiple awards for Best Child Performer
Throughout the history of Metro Manila Film Festival (MMFF), there have been actors who received multiple Awards for Best Child Performer. As of 2015 (41st MMFF), 4 actors have received two or more Best Child Performer awards.

References

External links
IMDB: Metro Manila Film Festival
Official website of the Metro Manila Film Festival

Child Performer